After Hours with Miss "D" is a 1954 studio album by Dinah Washington. The 2004 CD reissue included an extended take of "Blue Skies".

Track listing 
 "Blue Skies" (Irving Berlin) – 7:52
 "Bye Bye Blues" (David Bennett, Chauncey Gray, Frederick Hamm, Bert Lown) – 6:58
 "Am I Blue?" (Harry Akst, Grant Clarke) – 3:14
 "Our Love Is Here to Stay" (George Gershwin, Ira Gershwin) – 2:31
 "A Foggy Day" (G. Gershwin, I. Gershwin) – 7:59
 "I Let a Song Go Out of My Heart" (Duke Ellington, Irving Mills, Henry Nemo) – 7:02
 "Pennies from Heaven" (Arthur Johnston, Johnny Burke) – 2:17
 "Love for Sale" (Cole Porter) – 2:12
 "Blue Skies" – 10:54

Personnel 

 Dinah Washington – vocals
 Clark Terry – Trumpet
 Gus Chappell – Trombone
 Rick Henderson – Alto Saxophone
 Eddie Chamblee – Tenor Saxophone
 Eddie "Lockjaw" Davis – Tenor Saxophone 
 Paul Quinichette – Tenor Saxophone
 Clarence "Sleepy" Anderson – Piano
 Junior Mance – Piano
 Jackie Davis – Organ
 Keter Betts – Bass
 Candido Camero – Congas
 Ed Thigpen – Drums

References 

1954 debut albums
Dinah Washington albums
Mercury Records albums
Verve Records albums